The Royal Caledonian Curling Club (RCCC), branded as Scottish Curling is a curling club in Edinburgh, Scotland. It developed the first official rules for the sport, and is the governing body of curling in Scotland. The RCCC was founded on 25 July 1838 in Edinburgh, and granted its royal charter by Queen Victoria in 1843, after she had witnessed a demonstration of the sport played on the polished ballroom floor of Scone Palace the previous year.

The club's objective is "To unite curlers throughout the world into one Brotherhood of the Rink", and it has branches and affiliated associations and clubs in Austria, Belgium, Canada, Denmark, England, Finland, France, Germany, the Netherlands, Ireland, Italy, Japan, Luxembourg, New Zealand, Norway, South Africa, Spain, Switzerland, the United States and Wales.

In 1853 the club established a curling pond for Grand Matches at Carsebreck Loch in Perth and Kinross. This site saw 25 such matches that were served by the club's own private Carsbreck until the last was held at this site in 1935.

World Curling Federation
The World Curling Federation (WCF), the governing body for international curling, originated as a committee (formed in Perth, Scotland in March 1965) of the Royal Caledonian Curling Club, and became an independent organisation in 1982. The WCF officially recognises the Royal Caledonian Curling Club, as the Mother Club of Curling. The WCF is still based in Perth, although for a brief period between 1994 and 2000 it too was based in Edinburgh with the mother club.

Championship events 
Scottish Curling, as the national governing body for curling, holds a number of championship events throughout the year.

 Scottish Curling Men's Championship
 Scottish Curling Women's Championship
Scottish Curling Mixed Doubles Championship
 Scottish Curling Mixed Championship
 Scottish Curling Senior Championships
 Scottish Curling Senior Mixed Championship
 Scottish Curling Junior Championships
 Scottish Curling Schools Championship
 Scottish Curling Masters Championship
 Scottish Curling Pairs Championship
 Scottish Curling Wheelchair Championship

See also
List of curling clubs in Scotland
Curling at the 1924 Winter Olympics
Grand Match
Bonspiel
Sport in Scotland

References

External links

Curling: The Roarin' Game - Organization of Curling as a World Sport
The Gordon International
Competitions brochure

Curling
Curling clubs in Scotland
Sports teams in Edinburgh
Scots language
Sport in Perth, Scotland
1838 establishments in Scotland
Curling clubs established in 1838
Organisations based in Edinburgh
Caledonian Curling Club
Curling governing bodies